Janeane Marie Garofalo (born September 28, 1964) is an American comedian, actress, and former co-host on the now-defunct Air America Radio's The Majority Report.

Garofalo began her career as a stand-up comedian and became a cast member on The Ben Stiller Show, The Larry Sanders Show, and Saturday Night Live, then appeared in more than 50 movies, with leading or major roles in  The Truth About Cats and Dogs, Wet Hot American Summer, The Matchmaker, Reality Bites, The Wild, Steal This Movie!, Clay Pigeons, Sweethearts, Mystery Men, The Minus Man, and The Independent, among numerous others.  She has been a series regular on television programs such as Wet Hot American Summer: First Day of Camp, 24, Girlfriends' Guide to Divorce, and Ideal.

Garofalo continues to circulate regularly within New York City's local comedy and performance art scene.

Early life
Garofalo was born in Newton, New Jersey, the daughter of Joan and Carmine Garofalo. Her mother was a secretary, in the petrochemical industry, who died of cancer when Janeane was 24. Her father is a former executive at Exxon. Garofalo is of Italian/Irish descent. She grew up in various places, including Ontario, California; Madison, New Jersey; and Houston, Texas, where she graduated from James E. Taylor High School. Garofalo is quoted as having disliked life in Houston because of the heat and humidity and the emphasis on prettiness and sports in high school.

While studying history at Providence College, Garofalo entered a comedy talent search sponsored by the Showtime cable network, winning the title of "Funniest Person in Rhode Island." Her original gimmick was to read off her hand, which was not successful in subsequent performances. Dreaming of earning a slot on the writing staff of the TV show Late Night With David Letterman, she became a professional standup upon graduating from college with degrees in History and American Studies. She struggled for a number of years, even working briefly as a bike messenger in Boston.

Entertainment career

Stand-up comedy

Garofalo officially began her career in stand-up comedy in the mid-1980s during the pre-grunge era. Her appearance was often in line with very mid-1980s style: disheveled with thick black glasses and unkempt hair. Her comedy is often self deprecating; she has made fun of popular culture and the pressures on women to conform to body image ideals promoted by the media.

When in San Francisco, Garofalo was a frequent guest at the San Francisco Comedy Condo.

Garofalo's comedy shows involve her and her notebook, which is filled with years' worth of article clippings and random observations she references for direct quotes during her act. Garofalo has said that she does not tell jokes as much as make observations designed to get laughs. She was part of the alternative comedy scene in Los Angeles in the early 1990s, appearing at Un-Cabaret and other venues and co-created the "Eating It" alternative stand-up comedy show, which ran at Luna Lounge on the Lower East Side of New York City between 1995 and 2005, frequently hosting the show and appearing as a performer.

She appeared on HBO's Comedy Half-Hour and Comedy Hour specials in 1995 and 1997, respectively, among similar subsequent appearances, including a one-hour stand-up special entitled If You Will, performed at Seattle's Moore Theatre that aired on Epix in June 2010 and was released on DVD in September 2010.

Film career
Garofalo has performed a variety of roles in more than 50 feature films, playing leading or large roles in The Truth About Cats & Dogs, I Shot a Man in Vegas, The Matchmaker, Clay Pigeons, Steal This Movie!, Sweethearts, Mystery Men, The Independent, Wet Hot American Summer, Manhood, Ash Tuesday, and Bad Parents.

Garofalo's first movie role, filmed the year before she appeared on national television, was a brief comical appearance as a counter worker in a burger joint in Late for Dinner in 1991, but her real breakthrough into film came in Reality Bites (1994) as Winona Ryder's character's Gap-managing best friend Vickie.

Further television work and supporting roles in feature films included Bye Bye Love and Now and Then, and a leading role in I Shot a Man in Vegas, until 1996 when she was cast in the starring role in the romantic comedy The Truth About Cats & Dogs, a variation on Cyrano de Bergerac which featured Uma Thurman in the top-billed but smaller role as a beautiful but vapid model, while Garofalo played a highly intelligent radio host. Initially an independent film, it became a studio movie when Uma Thurman was signed to play the shallow model.

Based on the success of this film, a producer then offered her the part of Dorothy Boyd in Jerry Maguire with Tom Cruise if she could lose weight; after trimming down, however, she learned that Renée Zellweger had won the part instead.

She turned down the role of television reporter Gale Weathers in Wes Craven's Scream because she thought the film would be too violent: "I said I didn't want to be in a movie where a teen girl was disemboweled. I didn't know it turned out so good, and it was a funny movie."

Following up The Truth About Cats and Dogs, Garofalo played the lead role in The Matchmaker, a 1997 romantic comedy film about the misadventures of a cynical American woman who reluctantly visits Ireland; it is Garofalo's first and only lead role to date. That same year, she played a supporting role as a deputy sheriff in the drama Cop Land, a police gangster film starring Sylvester Stallone, Harvey Keitel, Ray Liotta and Robert DeNiro. In 1998, she performed her first voice-acting job playing "Ursula the Artist" in Disney's English dub of Studio Ghibli's Kiki's Delivery Service and briefly appeared in Permanent Midnight. In 1999, she starred as "The Bowler" in the film Mystery Men, about an underdog group of super heroes.

In 2000, she portrayed Abbie Hoffman's wife Anita Hoffman opposite Vincent D'Onofrio as Hoffman in Steal This Movie!, involving the couple's political activism during the Vietnam War era. Later that same year, she received second billing under Jerry Stiller in a comedic film about a low-budget movie producer entitled The Independent. The following year, Garofalo was top-billed in Wet Hot American Summer, the 2001 cult comedy about an American summer camp, and starred in The Search for John Gissing.

In 2002, she played Catherine Connolly in The Laramie Project and in 2003, she starred in Manhood and Ash Tuesday, and appeared in the crime film Wonderland. She played a supporting role in Jiminy Glick in Lalawood in 2004.

A puppet version of Garofalo appeared (and was graphically killed off) in the 2004 movie Team America: World Police; while Garofalo was irritated by the parody, she was more upset by the filmmakers' lack of correspondence. "I ran into them in the street, Trey and the other guy, and I said to them, 'The least you could do is send me a puppet.' And they said OK, took my address down ... and never sent me a puppet! So while Team America bothered me, the fact they didn't send me my puppet, that bothered me even more."

In 2005, she played the ex-wife of a man coping with the reverberations of a divorce in Duane Hopwood. In 2006, she performed Bridget the giraffe's voice in the computer-animated Disney feature film The Wild. In 2007, she provided the voice of Colette Tatou, a chef in the Pixar/Disney feature film Ratatouille, in which Garofalo affected a pronounced French accent for the role, appropriate for a character based on a French cook described as the world's best female chef. She made cameo appearances in The Guitar in 2008 and Labor Pains in 2009, and starred in Bad Parents in 2012, a comedy about New Jersey soccer moms obsessing over their children's experiences playing the sport. She starred in the 2015 film 3rd Street Blackout.

Television
Garofalo's big break came in 1990 after meeting Ben Stiller at Canter's Deli in Los Angeles, where they were hanging out with stand-up friends. They bonded over their "love of SCTV, early Saturday Night Live, and Albert Brooks."

Her first exposure on national television came soon thereafter by way of her appearance as a stand-up comic on MTV's Half Hour Comedy Hour. Subsequently, her first television series debut was on the short-lived Ben Stiller Show on Fox in 1992, on which she was a cast member alongside longtime friends Bob Odenkirk and Andy Dick.

A chance meeting on the set of that show led her to being offered the role of Paula on The Larry Sanders Show on HBO, earning her two Primetime Emmy Award for Outstanding Supporting Actress in a Comedy Series nominations in 1996 and 1997. For a time, she was actually working on both series simultaneously.
After The Ben Stiller Show was cancelled, Garofalo joined the cast of Saturday Night Live (SNL) for its 1994–95 season. She left SNL in March 1995 (mid-season) after only six months, saying that the experience left her "anxious and depressed", and that a sexist attitude pervaded the show. She said that many of the sketches were "juvenile and homophobic". According to New York Magazine, Garofalo was "largely stuck in dull, secondary wife and girlfriend roles", and quoted her friends as saying that she considered the stint "the most miserable experience of [her] life."

Following SNL, Garofalo appeared in a plethora of guest star roles: the grown-up daughter of the Buchmans on the final episode of Mad About You; Jerry Seinfeld's female counterpart (and, briefly, fiancée) Jeannie Steinman on Seinfeld; a recurring correspondent on Michael Moore's TV Nation, and a former girlfriend of Dave Foley's character on Newsradio.  She provided the voice for the weekly conversations between the series lead and an older friend (Garofalo) in Felicity. Two television pilots starring Garofalo, the 2003 ABC show Slice O'Life about a reporter consigned to sappy human interest stories appearing at the end of news broadcasts, and the 2005 NBC program All In, based on the life of poker star Annie Duke, were not picked up by their respective networks.

Throughout the 2005–06 television season, Garofalo appeared on The West Wing as Louise Thornton, a campaign adviser to the fictional Democratic presidential nominee.

In 2006, she provided the voice for the animated character "Bearded Clam" on Comedy Central's Freak Show. In 2007, she wrote a dedication for the mini-book included in the six-DVD box-set of the 1994 cult series My So-Called Life.

Garofalo had segments entitled "the disquisition" in several episodes of the 2007 season of The Henry Rollins Show which took place in her apartment, much in the same way Rollins' segments take place at his house. In 2009, Garofalo joined the cast of 24, where she starred as Janis Gold. In 2010, Garofalo joined the cast of Ideal as Tilly. She was a cast member of the Criminal Minds short-lived spinoff TV series Criminal Minds: Suspect Behavior in 2011.

In 2014, she portrayed Lyla, an entertainment lawyer, in seven episodes of the TV series Girlfriends' Guide to Divorce. In 2015, she starred alongside most of the original cast in the Netflix eight-episode prequel to the 2001 comedy film Wet Hot American Summer. In 2017, Garofalo starred in E4's comedy-drama series Gap Year.

Writing
Garofalo co-wrote a comedic New York Times bestseller with Ben Stiller in 1999, entitled Feel This Book: An Essential Guide to Self-Empowerment, Spiritual Supremacy, and Sexual Satisfaction, a spoof of the self-help books so prevalent at the time. She wrote her HBO Comedy Half-Hour along with similar appearances and programs, co-wrote some sketches on The Ben Stiller Show, wrote an episode of the television series Head Case, and wrote and directed a 2001 comedy short entitled Housekeeping.

Political views

Garofalo has been open and outspoken regarding her liberal political views. She is a feminist.  In an interview for Geek Monthly magazine, she stated that she was raised in a conservative family.

She has appeared with political figures such as Ralph Nader (whom she supported in the 2000 election, but opposed in 2004) and Jello Biafra at various events. In 2007, Garofalo described herself as an atheist, and participated in a radio interview by Freethought Radio, a show by the Freedom From Religion Foundation.

She became more prominent as a progressive when she voiced opposition to what became the 2003 Iraq War, appearing on CNN and Fox News to discuss it. She said that she was approached by groups such as MoveOn.org and Win Without War to go on TV, because these organizations say that the networks were not allowing antiwar voices to be heard. Garofalo and the other celebrities who appeared at the time said they thought their fame could lend attention to that side of the debate. Her appearances on cable news prior to the war garnered her praise from the left and spots on the cover of Ms. and Venus Zine. Garofalo has had frequent on-air political disputes with Bill O'Reilly, Brian Kilmeade, and Jonah Goldberg.

Prior to the 2003 Iraq War, she took a position on the alleged threat posed by Saddam Hussein. For example, in an interview with Tony Snow on a February 23, 2003 episode of Fox News Sunday, Garofalo said of the Iraqi dictator: 

In March 2003, she took part in the Code Pink anti-war march in Washington, D.C. That autumn, she served as emcee at several stops on the Tell Us the Truth tour, a political-themed concert series featuring Steve Earle, Billy Bragg, Tom Morello, and others. Throughout the year, Garofalo also actively campaigned for Howard Dean. While on Fox News' program The Pulse, O'Reilly asked Garofalo what she would do if her predictions that the Iraq war would be a disaster were to turn out wrong. Garofalo stated:

Garofalo said she had misgivings in 2007 about the depiction of torture in the television series 24 but joined the cast because "being unemployed and being flattered that someone wanted to work with me outweighed my stance".

In April 2009, Garofalo drew criticism from The Washington Times when she denounced Tea Party protests, which she referred to as racist. She has continued to criticize Tea Party protesters.

Air America Radio
In late March 2004, Garofalo became a co-host for Air America Radio's new show The Majority Report, alongside Sam Seder. The early days of Air America Radio are chronicled in the documentary Left of the Dial, which includes a debate between Garofalo and her conservative father Carmine, who was initially a regular guest on The Majority Report.

Garofalo commented on her show of April 28, 2006 supporting the Scientology-linked New York Rescue Workers Detoxification Project, a controversial treatment for workers suffering ailments from 9/11 clean-up efforts in New York City.

Personal life
Garofalo struggled with alcoholism, stating in a 2021 interview that she gave up drinking in 2001.

Garofalo married Robert Cohen, who was then a writer for The Ben Stiller Show, in Las Vegas in 1991. She later explained that it was intended to be a joke, the pair thinking that the marriage was not binding unless it had been filed at a local courthouse. It was discovered later, when Cohen tried to marry someone else, that the marriage was indeed legal. The union was dissolved in 2012.

Filmography

Film

Television

Music videos
 "Angel Mine" (Cowboy Junkies) (1996)

Documentaries
 New York: A Documentary Film (1999)
 Outlaw Comic: The Censoring of Bill Hicks (2003)
 Dangerous Living: Coming Out In The Developing World (2003)
 Gigantic (A Tale of Two Johns) (2003)
 Left of the Dial (2005), HBO
 I Am Comic (2010)
 Misery Loves Comedy (2015)
 Sticky: A (Self) Love Story (2016)
 Too Soon: Comedy After 9/11 (2021)

Books
 Feel This Book: An Essential Guide to Self-Empowerment, Spiritual Supremacy, and Sexual Satisfaction  (with Ben Stiller)

See also
 Saturday Night Live parodies of Hillary Clinton
 Quote from her featured in The NY Times: "“If you behave in a manner pleasing to most, then you are probably doing something wrong. The masses have never been arbiters of the sublime, and they often fail to recognize the truly great individual. Taking into account the public’s regrettable lack of taste, it is incumbent on you to not fit in.”

References

External links

 
 
 
 
 
 
 

1964 births
Living people
American atheists
American comedy writers
American women writers
American film actresses
American political commentators
American talk radio hosts
American women radio presenters
American stand-up comedians
American television actresses
American voice actresses
American people of Irish descent
American people of Italian descent
Audiobook narrators
Actresses from New Jersey
People from Katy, Texas
People from Madison, New Jersey
People from Newton, New Jersey
Providence College alumni
American women comedians
American feminists
20th-century American actresses
21st-century American actresses
Writers from New Jersey
American sketch comedians
New Jersey Democrats
Former Roman Catholics
20th-century American comedians
21st-century American comedians